The Romancing Star II (Chinese: 精裝追女仔之2) is a 1988 Hong Kong romantic comedy film written and directed by Wong Jing and starring Andy Lau, Eric Tsang, Natalis Chan and Stanley Fung. Chow Yun-fat, the star of the film's precedent The Romancing Star, makes a brief cameo in the opening scene. The film was later followed by The Romancing Star III released in the following year.

Plot
Lau Pei collaborates with his friends to film a drama series to impress his crush Po-chu, but the drama series leads to unexpected levels of popularity.

Cast
Andy Lau as Lau Pei
Eric Tsang as Silver / Mocking Face
Natalis Chan as Tony / Traffic Light
Stanley Fung as Ken Lau
Lo Hoi-pang as Mr. Chow
Wong Jing as Simon Hand
Carina Lau as Fong Fong
Elizabeth Lee as Ching Po-chu
Ngan Ning as Ka-yin
Wong Wan-sze as Sister 13
Chow Yun-fat as Fred Wong / Big Mouth Fat (cameo)
Alan Tam as himself in lift (cameo)
Michael Lai as Mr. Lai
Cheng Gwan-min
Ben Wong
Charlie Cho as Mr. Tsang
Yu Mo-lin as Lady in phone booth (red dress)
Manfred Wong as Furniture mover's boss
Lam Fai-wong as man in toilet (cameo)
Lily Ng as Simon's lover
Mak Wai-cheung as CID at bank
William Ho as Mickey in Prison on Fire parody (cameo)
Victor Hon as Prisoner in Prison on Fire parody (cameo)
Thomas Sin as Prisoner in Prison on Fire parody (cameo)
Tony Tam as Gangster boss at hawker stall
Chun Kwai-po as Gangster at hawker stall
Chang Sing-kwong as Gangster at hawker stall
Leung Hak-shun as Councillor Sze To Ming
Cheung Kwok-wah as Guest at Brother Lung's funeral (cameo)
Mak Hiu-wai as Guest at Brother Lung's funeral
Yip Seung-wah as Compere
Mau Kin-tak as Channel 8 TV's staff
Shirley Kwan as Woman at Brother Lung's funeral
Sherman Wong as Chow TV's production staff
Lee Chuen-hau as Chow TV's interviewee
Fan Chin-hung as gangster at hawker stall

Theme songs
Flaming Red Lips (烈焰紅唇)
Composer: Anthony Lun
Lyricist: Calvin Poon
Singer: Anita Mui
Sunshine Big Clearance Sale (陽光大減價)
Composer: Michael Leeson, Peter Vale
Lyricist: Lo Wing-keung
Singer: Bennett Pang

Box office
The film grossed HK$17,096,271 at the Hong Kong box office during its theatrical run from 21 January to 10 February 1988 in Hong Kong.

See also
Andy Lau filmography
Chow Yun-fat filmography
Wong Jing filmography

External links

The Romancing Star II at Hong Kong Cinemagic

1988 films
1988 romantic comedy films
Hong Kong romantic comedy films
Hong Kong slapstick comedy films
1980s Cantonese-language films
Hong Kong sequel films
Films about actors
Films directed by Wong Jing
Films set in Hong Kong
Films shot in Hong Kong
1980s Hong Kong films